Shcherbatiuk is a surname. Notable people with the surname include:

Myroslava Shcherbatiuk (born 1974), Ukrainian diplomat
Roman Shcherbatiuk (born 1997), Ukrainian kickboxer

Ukrainian-language surnames